Thomas Burgess was an 18th-century British painter.

Life
Burgess received his art education at the St. Martin's Lane Academy, and on becoming in 1766 a member of the Incorporated Society of Artists, sent to its exhibitions numerous portraits, conversation-pieces, and studies of various life.

In 1778, when living in Kemp’s Row, Chelsea, he was represented for the first time at the Royal Academy by three pictures: William the Conqueror Dismounted by his Eldest Son, Hannibal Swearing Enmity to the Romans, and Our Saviour‘s Appearance to Mary Magdalen He later exhibited a self-portrait and some landscapes. His last contribution to the Academy, in 1786, was The Death of Athelwold

Burgess gained  a high reputation as a teacher, and for some time kept a drawing school in Maiden Lane, Covent Garden, which had considerable success. Among his pupils was the portrait miniaturist Martha Isaacs.

References

Attribution

Year of birth unknown
Year of death unknown
18th-century English painters
English male painters
Painters from London
18th-century English male artists